This is a list of teen magazines.

Magazines

See also
Teen magazine
Lists of magazines

References

List
Works about adolescence
Adolescence-related lists
Teen